Hemiarthridae is a family of chitons belonging to the order Chitonida.

Genera:
 Hemiarthrum Carpenter
 Weedingia Kaas, 1988

References

Chitons
Chiton families